Rick Steier (born October 8, 1960, in Louisville, Kentucky) is a guitarist who has played in the bands Warrant, Kingdom Come, Wild Horses, and KrunK/Kottak. Drummer and fellow Louisville native James Kottak was also in all these bands with Rick Steier.

Discography

With Kingdom Come
Kingdom Come (1988)
In Your Face (1989)

With Wild Horses
Bareback (1991)
Dead Ahead (2003)

With Warrant
Ultraphobic (1995)
Belly to Belly Vol. 1 (1996)
Greatest & Latest (1999)

References

External links
 

1960 births
Living people
American rock guitarists
American male guitarists
Kingdom Come (band) members
Warrant (American band) members
Wild Horses (American rock band) members
Musicians from Louisville, Kentucky
Rock musicians from Kentucky
Guitarists from Kentucky
20th-century American guitarists